The Belgium women's national under-19 volleyball team represents Belgium in international women's volleyball competitions and friendly matches under the age 19 and it is ruled and managed by the Belgium Royal Volleyball Federation That is an affiliate of Federation of International Volleyball FIVB and also a part of European Volleyball Confederation CEV.

History

Results

Summer Youth Olympics
 Champions   Runners up   Third place   Fourth place

FIVB U19 World Championship
 Champions   Runners up   Third place   Fourth place

Europe U18 / U17 Championship
 Champions   Runners up   Third place   Fourth place

Team

Current squad
The following is the Belgian roster in the 2015 FIVB Volleyball Girls' U18 World Championship.

Head Coach: Fien Callens

Notable players
Ilka Van de Vyver
Laura Heyrman
Lise Van Hecke

References

External links
Official national team website 
Official KBVBV website 

National women's under-18 volleyball teams
Volleyball in Belgium
Women's volleyball in Belgium
Volleyball